Sten Hagander (November 22, 1891 – April 22, 1981) was a Swedish track and field athlete who competed in the 1912 Summer Olympics. In 1912 he finished eleventh in the two handed javelin throw event.

References

External links
profile 

1891 births
1981 deaths
Swedish male javelin throwers
Olympic athletes of Sweden
Athletes (track and field) at the 1912 Summer Olympics